Gurdeep is an Indian given name, used by both sexes and predominantly by those who follow the religion of Sikhism. Notable people with the name include:

Gurdeep Kohli, Indian television actress
Gurdeep Samra, British Asian music producer and DJ
Gurdeep Kandola, English cricketer
Gurdeep "Deep" Roy, Anglo-Indian actor
Gurdeep Pandher, Sikh-Canadian, Yukon-based author, teacher and performer, who makes Punjabi dance videos that often go viral

References

Indian unisex given names